The 2011 Manitoba floods may refer to:

2011 Red River flood
2011 Assiniboine River flood
2011 Souris River flood

See also
2011 Mississippi River floods